Issam Tej (born 29 July 1979) is a former Tunisian/Qatari handball player for Al Rayyan and the Qatar.

He competed at the 2000 Summer Olympics in Sydney. He also competed for the Tunisian national team at the 2012 Summer Olympics in London, where the Tunisian team reached the quarterfinals.

References

1979 births
Living people
Sportspeople from Tunis
Tunisian male handball players
Olympic handball players of Tunisia
Handball players at the 2000 Summer Olympics
Handball players at the 2012 Summer Olympics
Handball players at the 2016 Summer Olympics
Expatriate handball players
Tunisian expatriate sportspeople in France
Tunisian expatriate sportspeople in Qatar
Montpellier Handball players